The A-Leagues All Star Game is a association football match contested by the A-Leagues All Stars team against an invitee club. The All Stars team is made up of selected A-League Men players. The game is played during the footballing off-season, the first of which was held on 20 July 2013. After the 2014 edition, the All Star Game was not held for almost a decade, before the concept was revived in 2022 and is expected to continue for at least the 2023, 2024 and 2025 A-League seasons as part of the commercial agreement with the NSW State Government to play a "Football Festival" culminating with the A-League Grand final in Sydney for those three seasons.

Background
On 13 November 2012, it was confirmed that Manchester United would come to Australia and play an all-star team consisting of A-League players. The inaugural A-League All Stars Game took place on 20 July 2013, against Manchester United. The A-League team was picked by an online vote by fans and by the appointed manager. On 20 December 2013, it was confirmed that Juventus would compete against the all-star team for the 2014 game, again hosted in Sydney. 
On 6 April 2022 it was announced that a third A-League All Stars match would be held against Barcelona on 25 May 2022, again in Sydney.

Games

The 2013 and 2014 matches were televised in Australia by Seven Network. The 2022 match was televised on 10 Bold.

References

External links

All Stars
 
Annual sporting events in Australia
Recurring sporting events established in 2013
Recurring events disestablished in 2015
Australian soccer friendly trophies